The following outline traces the territorial evolution of the U.S. State of South Dakota.

Outline

Historical territorial claims of the United Kingdom in the present State of South Dakota:
Rupert's Land, 1670–1870
Anglo-American Convention of 1818
Historical territorial claims of France in the present State of South Dakota:
Louisiane, 1682–1764
Treaty of Fontainebleau of 1762
Historical territorial claims of Spain in the present State of South Dakota:
Luisiana, 1764–1803
Third Treaty of San Ildefonso of 1800
Historical territorial claims of France in the present State of South Dakota:
Louisiane, 1803
Vente de la Louisiane of 1803
Historical political divisions of the United States in the present State of South Dakota:
Unorganized territory created by the Louisiana Purchase, 1803–1804
District of Louisiana, 1804–1805
Territory of Louisiana, 1805–1812
Territory of Missouri, 1812–1821
Unorganized territory formerly the northwestern Missouri Territory, 1821–1854
Treaty of Fort Laramie of 1851
Territory of Michigan east of Missouri River, 1805-(1834–1836)-1837
Territory of Wisconsin east of Missouri River, (1836–1838)-1848
Territory of Iowa east of Missouri River, 1838–1846
Territory of Minnesota east of Missouri River, 1849–1858
Territory of Nebraska west of Missouri River, (1854–1861)-1867
Territory of Dakota, 1861-1889
Land between the 43rd parallel north and Keya Paha River or Niobrara River was transferred to the State of Nebraska, 1882
State of South Dakota, since November 2, 1889

See also
Historical outline of South Dakota
History of South Dakota
Territorial evolution of the United States
 Territorial evolution of Iowa
 Territorial evolution of Minnesota
 Territorial evolution of Montana
 Territorial evolution of Nebraska
 Territorial evolution of North Dakota
 Territorial evolution of Wyoming

References

External links
State of South Dakota website
South Dakota State Historical Society
South Dakota State History Online

Pre-statehood history of South Dakota
South Dakota
South Dakota
South Dakota
South Dakota
Geography of South Dakota